Patarnieki  is a village in eastern Latvia, near the country's border with Belarus.

References

See also 
List of cities in Latvia

Villages in Latvia